Little Italy is a 1921 American comedy film directed by George Terwilliger and written by Tom McNamara and Peter Milne. The film stars Alice Brady, Norman Kerry, George Fawcett, Jack Ridgeway, Gertrude Norman, and Luis Alberni. The film was released in July 1921 by Realart Pictures Corporation.

Cast   
Alice Brady as Rosa Mascani
Norman Kerry as Antonio Tumullo
George Fawcett as Marco Mascani
Jack Ridgeway as Father Kelly 
Gertrude Norman as Anna
Luis Alberni as Ricci
Marguerite Forrest as Bianca

References

External links

1921 films
1920s English-language films
Silent American comedy films
1921 comedy films
Films directed by George Terwilliger
American silent feature films
American black-and-white films
1920s American films